A braced frame is a structural system designed to resist wind and earthquake forces. Members in a braced frame are not allowed to sway laterally (which can be done using shear wall or a diagonal steel sections, similar to a truss).

Types of braced frame

Most braced frames are concentric. This means that, where members intersect at a node, the centroid of each member passes through the same point. 

Concentrically braced frames can further be classified as either ordinary or special. Ordinary concentric braced frames (OCBFs) do not have extensive requirements regarding members or connections, and are frequently used in areas of low seismic risk. OCBF steel frame buildings originated in Chicago and reinforced concrete frames originated in Germany and France – areas where earthquakes were not an engineering consideration. Accordingly, special concentrically or eccentrically braced frames were later developed with extensive design requirements, and are frequently used in areas of high seismic risk. The purpose of the concentrically- or eccentrically-braced design is to ensure adequate ductility (i.e., to stretch without breaking suddenly).

See also 
 Structural engineering
 Earthquake engineering
 Buckling-restrained braced frame

References 

 AISC Steel Construction Manual
 AISC Seismic Design Manual
 SEAOC Seismology Committee (2008). “Concentrically braced frames,” August, 2008, The SEAOC Blue Book: Seismic design recommendations, Structural Engineers Association of California, Sacramento, CA.

External links 
 AISC - Home

Earthquake and seismic risk mitigation
Structural system